Katharina Louise Mo-Berge (born 28 August 1944) is a Norwegian cross-country skier and orienteering competitor from Trondheim. She competed in 10 km at the 1968 Winter Olympics in Grenoble, and in 5 and 10 km at the 1972 Winter Olympics in Sapporo.

She was Norwegian cross-country skiing champion in 1972, in both 5 and 10 km, and was awarded the King's Cup.

She competed in the 1968 World Orienteering Championships, where she placed 12th in the individual competition.

Cross-country skiing results

Olympic Games

World Championships

References

External links

1944 births
Living people
Sportspeople from Trondheim
Norwegian female cross-country skiers
Norwegian orienteers
Female orienteers
Olympic cross-country skiers of Norway
Cross-country skiers at the 1968 Winter Olympics
Cross-country skiers at the 1972 Winter Olympics
20th-century Norwegian women
21st-century Norwegian women